The 2021–22 season was the 94th season in the existence of Real Valladolid and the club's first season back in the second division of Spanish football since 2018. In addition to the domestic league, Valladolid participated in this season's edition of the Copa del Rey.

Players

First-team squad
.

Reserve team

Out on loan

Transfers

In

Out

Pre-season and friendlies

Competitions

Overall record

Segunda División

League table

Results summary

Results by round

Matches
The league fixtures were announced on 30 June 2021.

Copa del Rey

References

Real Valladolid seasons
Valladolid